Economic and Environmental Geology is a peer-reviewed open access scholarly journal publishing original research and reviews in the fields of ore deposits, economic and environmental geology of the solid Earth at all scales. It the official journal of the Korean Society of Economic and Environmental Geology. The current editor-in-chief is Minhee Lee.

Abstracting and indexing 
The journal is abstracted and indexed in:

References

External links 
 

Open access journals
Publications established in 1968
Geology journals